The 2011–12 Texas Longhorns men's basketball team represented the University of Texas at Austin in the 2011–12 NCAA Division I men's basketball season. Their head coach was Rick Barnes, who was in his 14th year. The team played its home games at the Frank Erwin Center in Austin, Texas and are members of the Big 12 Conference. They finished the season 20–14, 9–9 in Big 12 play to finish in sixth place. They lost in the semifinals of the Big 12 Basketball tournament to Missouri. They received an at-large bid to the 2012 NCAA tournament where they lost in the second round to Cincinnati.

Recruiting
Source:

Schedule

Source:

|-
!colspan=9| Regular season

 

|-
!colspan=12|Phillips 66 Big 12 Championship
|-

|-
!colspan=12|2012 NCAA tournament
|-

Rankings

Roster

References

Texas
Texas Longhorns men's basketball seasons
Texas
2011 in sports in Texas
2012 in sports in Texas